Phurbu & Tenzin is a 2014 Chinese historical drama film directed by Fu Dongyu.

Cast
Lawang Lop
Ngawang Rinchen
Sonam Dolgar
Yang Xue
Duobujie

Reception

Box office
The film earned  at the Chinese box office.

Accolades

References

2010s historical drama films
Chinese historical drama films
Tibetan-language films
Films about Tibet
2014 drama films
2010s English-language films
2010s Mandarin-language films